Sagamore refers to the following places in the U.S. state of Pennsylvania:

Sagamore, Armstrong County, Pennsylvania
Sagamore, Fayette County, Pennsylvania